The  Star of Bethlehem is a Christian tradition regarding the birth of Jesus.

Star of Bethlehem may also refer to:

Art
 Bethlehem Star, a metal star on the top of South Mountain above Bethlehem, Pennsylvania
 Star of Bethlehem (painting), a painting by Edward Burne-Jones

Film and TV
The Star of Bethlehem (1912 film), a 1912 silent film
The Star of Bethlehem (2007 film), a 2007 film from filmmaker Frederick Larson about his use of astronomy software

Music
 "Star of Bethlehem", an instrumental track on the 2007 Angels & Airwaves album I-Empire
 "Star of Bethlehem", a song from Home Alone and Home Alone 2: Lost in New York
 "Star of Bethlehem", a song from the 1977 Neil Young album American Stars 'n Bars

Botany
 Angraecum sesquipedale, an orchid 
 Calectasia cyanea, the "blue tinsel lily", of the family Dasypogonaceae
 Campanula isophylla, the Italian bellflower
 Gagea, a genus of Liliaceae and its species:
 Gagea bohemica, the "early star of Bethlehem", of the family Liliaceae
 Gagea lutea, the "yellow star of Bethlehem", of the family Liliaceae
 Hippobroma longiflora, the "star of Bethlehem", of the family Campanulaceae
 Ornithogalum, a genus of Hyacinthaceae, and to its species:
Ornithogalum arabicum, "Star-of-Bethlehem"
Ornithogalum narbonense, "Pyramidal star-of-Bethlehem"
Ornithogalum nutans, "Drooping star-of-Bethlehem"
Ornithogalum pyrenaicum, "Spiked star-of-Bethlehem"
Ornithogalum umbellatum, "Common star-of-Bethlehem"

See also